Phytoecia speciosa is a species of beetle in the family Cerambycidae. It was described by Janos Frivaldszky in 1884. It is known from Turkey and Syria. It feeds on Klasea cerinthifolia.

References

Phytoecia
Beetles described in 1884